Little Green Apples is an album by saxophonist Sonny Stitt recorded in 1969 and released on the Solid State label.

Reception

Allmusic awarded the album 3 stars.

Track listing 
 "Little Green Apples" (Bobby Russell) - 2:30
 "Beale Street Blues" (W.C. Handy) - 3:21
 "I Say a Little Prayer" (Burt Bacharach, Hal David) - 2:30
 "Oh Me, Oh My" (Jim Doris) - 2:42
 "I Go Congo" (Clarence Muse) - 3:40
 "Girl Watcher" (Buck Trail, Wayne Pittman) - 2:30
 "I've Never Ever Loved Before" (Richard Carpenter) - 2:45
 "Extra Special Delight" (Richard Carpenter) - 2:40
 "Friendless Blues" (Mercedes Gilbert) - 4:15
 "Ain'tcha Got Music" (James P. Johnson, Andy Razaf) - 3:36

Personnel 
Sonny Stitt - varitone, tenor saxophone
Haywood Henry - baritone saxophone
Donald Corrado, Joseph DeAngelis - French horn 
Paul Griffin - piano
Eric Gale - guitar
Bob Russell - electric bass
Joe Marshall - drums
Jimmy Mundy - arranger, conductor

References 

Sonny Stitt albums
1969 albums
Solid State Records (jazz label) albums
Albums arranged by Jimmy Mundy